Antoine Thomson d'Abbadie d'Arrast (3 January 1810 – 19 March 1897) was an Irish-born French explorer, geographer, ethnologist, linguist and astronomer notable for his travels in Ethiopia during the first half of the 19th century. He was the older brother of Arnaud-Michel d'Abbadie, with whom he travelled.

Biography
d'Arrast was born a British subject, in Dublin, Ireland, from a partially Basque noble family of the French province of Soule. His father, Michel Abbadie, was born in Arrast-Larrebieu and his mother was Irish. His grandfather Jean-Pierre was a lay abbot and a notary in Soule. The family moved to France in 1818 where the brothers received a careful scientific education. In 1827, Antoine received a bachelor's degree in Toulouse. Starting in 1829, he began his education in Paris, where he studied law.

He married Virginie Vincent de Saint-Bonnet on 21 February 1859, and settled in Hendaye where he purchased 250ha to build a castle, and became the mayor of the city from 1871 to 1875.

Abbadie was a knight of the Legion of Honour, which he received on 27 September 1850, and the president of the French Academy of Sciences. He died in 1897, and bequeathed the Abbadi domain and castle in Hendaye, yielding 40,000 francs a year, to the Academy of Sciences, on condition they produce a catalogue of half a million stars within fifty years.

Education
Michel d'Abbadie returned to France with his family around 1820. He first settled in Toulouse, where he saw to the education of his children. All were entrusted to the care of a governess: "I was brought up," says d'Abbadie, "with my sisters, in the English way, all day, all night in a dormitory, with a servant who watched scrupulously over us; and scarcely, every evening, did we have an hour, a single hour, not to converse with our parents by a familiar tutoiement, but, hearing at most some little tale of Daddy, to be relegated to our games in a corner of the room, and to answer any question by You, yes Sir, yes Madam. »

Antoine stayed three or four years at home, "Far from the martinet of a master of boarding school studies". But at the age of 13, he was sent to college, where he displayed exceptional ardor. Still a child, he shows an unusual curiosity for the unknown that surrounds him: "What is at the end of the road? he asked his governess. "A river, my friend. "And after the river?" — A mountain. "And after the mountain?" "I don't know, I've never been there. "Well, I'll go and see," replied the child. (Antoine d'Abbadie kept this insatiable curiosity all his life. He assimilates languages very quickly and speaks English, Italian, German, Latin, Greek, Hebrew, Arabic, Berber and at least five Ethiopian languages.)

In August 1827, he obtained his baccalaureate and returned to Toulouse to become a law student. His closest friends at this time were Pierre Étienne Simon Duchartre, Bernard-Adolphe Granier de Cassagnac and Léonce Guilhaud de Lavergne. These young people often talk about their plans for the future. Antoine d'Abbadie knows exactly what he wants to become: explorer in Africa! His project is to study the Christian civilizations of Abyssinia, to help them survive in the face of a conquering Islam and, incidentally, to look for the sources of the Nile.

In 1828, his family moved to Paris, rue Saint-Dominique, and Antoine devoted the next six years to the preparation of his project, reading travellers' accounts and studying languages, religions, and literature. He also took courses in Law, Geology, Mineralogy, Astronomy and Natural History at the Faculty.

Its preparation is not only intellectual; He also prepared physically for the fatigues and privations that awaited the explorers: he was very skilled in fencing, gymnastics and running. He is an exceptional swimmer. He also practices food deprivation.

He went to Ireland, his native country, in 1835, at the end of these years of apprenticeship.

Science and explorations 

In 1835 the French Academy sent Antoine on a scientific mission to Brazil, the results being published at a later date (1873) under the title of Observations relatives à la physique du globe faites au Brésil et en Éthiopie. He left in November 1836 in the frigate L'Andromède and had as a travelling companion Louis-Napoléon Bonaparte, exiled after the attempted uprising of Strasbourg, The two young men become friends. In 1837, the two brothers started for Ethiopia, landing at Massawa in February 1838. They journeyed throughout Ethiopia, travelling as far south as the Kingdom of Kaffa, sometimes together and sometimes separately. In addition to his studies in the sciences, he delved into the political fray exerting influence in favour of France and the Catholic missionaries. The two brothers returned to France in 1848 with notes on the geography, geology, archaeology, and natural history of the region.

The Abbadie brothers not only traveled around Abyssinia, they also saw, listened to and noted a great deal; human geography joins physical geography, but also religion, legislative texts, ethnography, philology, linguistics, numismatics, history, etc. Antoine collects 250 old manuscripts, and creates with the help of the Ethiopian Debtera Tewelde Medhin de Welkait, the first Amharic-French dictionary of 15,000 words and a lexicon of 40,000 words from 30 different languages.

Antoine became involved in various controversies relating both to his geographical results and his political intrigues. He was especially attacked by Charles Tilstone Beke, who impugned his veracity, especially with reference to the journey to Kana. But time and the investigations of subsequent explorers have shown that Abbadie was quite trustworthy as to his facts, though wrong in his assertion — hotly contested by Beke — that the Blue Nile was the main stream. The topographical results of his explorations were published in Paris between 1860 and 1873 in Géodésie d'Éthiopie, full of the most valuable information and illustrated by ten maps. Of the Géographie de l'Éthiopie (Paris, 1890) only one volume was published. In Un Catalogue raisonné de manuscrits éthiopiens (Paris, 1859) is a description of 234 Ethiopian manuscripts collected by Antoine. He also compiled various vocabularies, including a Dictionnaire de la langue amariñña (Paris, 1881), and prepared an edition of the Shepherd of Hermas, with the Latin version, in 1860. He published numerous papers dealing with the geography of Ethiopia, Ethiopian coins and ancient inscriptions. Under the title of Reconnaissances magnétiques he published in 1890 an account of the magnetic observations made by him in the course of several journeys to the Red Sea and the Levant. The general account of the travels of the two brothers was published by Arnaud in 1868 under the title of Douze ans dans la Haute Ethiopie.

Antoine was responsible for streamlining techniques in geodesy, along with inventing a new theodolite for measuring angles.

Basque and bascophile
Basque through his father, Abbadie developed a particular interest in the Basque Language after meeting Prince Louis Lucien Bonaparte in London. He started his academic work on Basque in 1852.

A speaker of both Souletin and Lapurdian, a resident of Lapurdi, Abbadie considered himself a Basque from Soule. The popularity of the motto Zazpiak Bat is attributed to Abbadie, coined in the framework of the Lore Jokoak Basque festivals that he fostered.

Abbadia Castle

Abbadie gave his castle home the name Abbadia, which is the name still used in Basque. However, in French it is usually referred to as Chateau d'Abbadie or Domaine d'Abbadia, and locally it is not unusual for it to be called le Chateau d'Antoine d'Abbadie.

The château was built between 1864 and 1879 on a cliff by the Atlantic Ocean, and was designed by Eugène Viollet-le-Duc in the Neo Gothic style. It is considered one of the most important examples of French Gothic Revival Architecture. It is divided in three parts: the observatory and library, the chapel, and the living quarters.

The château still belongs to the Academy of Science to which it was bequeathed in 1895 on condition of its producing a catalogue of half-a-million stars within fifty years' time, with the work to be carried out by members of religious orders.

The château was classified as a protected historical monument by France in 1984. Most of the château property now belongs to the Coastal Protection Agency, and is managed by the city of Hendaye.

Publications

Awards and memberships
Antoine received the French Legion of Honor on 27 September 1850 with the order of chevalier or knight. He was a member of the Bureau des Longitudes and also the French Academy of Sciences. Both brothers received the grand medal of the Paris Geographical Society in 1850.

Notes

Footnotes

References
 
 
 
 
 
  – Antoine d'Abbadie

External links
 

1810 births
1897 deaths
French explorers
People from Soule
19th-century French astronomers
French-Basque people
Basque-language writers
Members of the French Academy of Sciences
Members of the Lincean Academy
Irish people of Basque descent
Chevaliers of the Légion d'honneur
Irish emigrants to France
Ethiopianists